"Better Days" is a song by Irish singer-songwriter Dermot Kennedy. It was released on 28 July 2021 via Island Records. Kennedy wrote the song with Daniel Nigro, Carey Willetts, Sam Roman and Scott Harris, and it was produced by Nigro and Ryan Linvill.

Background
In an interview with Songwriter Universe, Kennedy stated he wrote the song in February 2021 during the COVID-19 pandemic. In September, during his tour of America, he told American Songwriter: "The way I saw it, that was almost the voice of my mother and father telling me to hold out and to know that my music would work out someday. Anytime I felt disheartened, felt down, like it wasn't going to work out—that's where this song sits for me".

Content
In a press release, Kennedy explained: "This is a song about patience. It's about believing in something brighter, and never losing sight of better days, no matter how hard things might get. In a time where so many people feel worried and exhausted, I would love for this song to remind even one person that things will improve. As an artist, I feel somewhat responsible to try to make people feel a little better, whether that’s making them think of someone they love, or just taking their mind off their problems for the length of a song. So this is my contribution to hopefully providing some people with a moment's solace. Better days will come". The song "come[s] with the kind of optimism and hopes Dermot has been so vocal about throughout his career, providing support and solace to so many".

Critical reception
Nora Onanian of WERS wrote that the song "feels like being lifted out of fog. [And] also gives a taste of a new direction Kennedy seems to be going in musically". Ed Power of The Irish Times commented that it "skilfully binds together elements of every popular Irish artist of the past 25 years", like The Script, and " in the choral backing sung in Irish, of The Cranberries at their most ethereal".

Music video
The music video was directed by Paul Gore. It showcases Kennedy "fighting a powerful jet stream underwater, push[ing] forward in scenes filled with tension, energy and movement", with him eventually "prevailing in his physical struggle".

Credits and personnel
Credits adapted from AllMusic.

 Clarence Coffee, Jr. – vocal producer
 Curtis Elvidge – vocal producer
 Neil Goody – vocal producer
 Matty Green – engineer, mixing
 Laurence Guy – primary artist
 Scott Harris – composer
 Dermot Kennedy – composer, primary artist, vocals
 Ryan Linvill – drum programming, producer, recording, saxophone, synthesizer programming
 Mitch McCarthy – mixing
 Randy Merrill – mastering engineer
 Daniel Nigro – bass, composer, drum programming, keyboards, piano, producer, vocals (background)
 Chappell Roan – vocals (background)
 Sam Romans – composer
 Carey Willetts – composer, vocal engineer

Charts

Weekly charts

Year-end charts

Certifications

References

2021 singles
2021 songs
Dermot Kennedy songs
Island Records singles
Songs written by Dermot Kennedy
Songs written by Carey Willetts
Songs written by Scott Harris (songwriter)
Songs written by Dan Nigro